Richard Harrison Bachman (born July 25, 1987) is an American former professional ice hockey goaltender who is currently the goaltending coach for the Iowa Wild of the American Hockey League (AHL). He played two seasons of college ice hockey at Colorado College before enjoying a career in the National Hockey League with the Dallas Stars, Edmonton Oilers and the Vancouver Canucks. Bachman was born in Salt Lake City, Utah, but grew up in Highlands Ranch, Colorado.

Playing career

Early career
As a youth, Bachman played in the 2001 Quebec International Pee-Wee Hockey Tournament with the Colorado Junior Avalanche minor ice hockey team from Littleton, Colorado.

During his time at Cushing Academy, Bachman compiled a GAA of 1.28 with 3 shutouts in 28 games He also split this time independently with the Boston Jr. Bruins. While at the Cedar Rapids RoughRiders of the United States Hockey League after a trade from the Chicago Steel, Bachman compiled a .913 save percentage in 26 regular-season starts. Bachman was chosen in the fourth round, 120th overall in the 2006 NHL Entry Draft by the Dallas Stars.

Colorado College
During his freshman year, Bachman became the second player in WCHA history to be named Player and Rookie of the Year in the same season.

As a sophomore in the 2008–09 season, Bachman posted a .914 save percentage with a 2.63 GAA.

Dallas Stars

On March 27, 2009, Bachman signed a three-year entry-level contract with the Dallas Stars, ending his college career. After spending his first professional season with American Hockey League affiliate the Texas Stars, Bachman was called up to Dallas in the following 2010–11 season on December 8, 2011. Bachman was called to back up Andrew Raycroft after the Stars' primary goalie, Kari Lehtonen, was placed on the Injury Reserve. He then made his debut with the Stars that day. With the Stars, Bachman started a trend for his goalie masks to 
have a theme of The Shining, acknowledging that "Richard Bachman" was also a pen name for Shining author Stephen King.

After he was initially reassigned to the Texas Stars to begin the 2011–12 season, Bachman was recalled a month into the season and replaced Andrew Raycroft as the primary backup to Kari Lehtonen. On December 13, 2011, Bachman earned his first NHL shutout, blanking the New York Rangers 1–0.

Edmonton Oilers
On July 6, 2013, Bachman signed a one-year deal with the Edmonton Oilers after becoming a free agent. Bachman competed with Jason LaBarbera for the backup goaltender position behind Devan Dubnyk. On October 27, Bachman had his first start with the Edmonton Oilers, making 47 saves but losing in a shootout to the Los Angeles Kings. In the 2013-14 NHL season Bachman suffered a hamstring injury and was eventually sent down to Oklahoma City, where he would play for the remainder of the season.

Vancouver Canucks
On July 1, 2015, Bachman signed as a free agent to a two-year contract with the Vancouver Canucks. Relegated to third goalie, Bachman only played one game for the Canucks and spent most of the season in the AHL, playing for the Utica Comets; the following season was spent entirely with the Comets.

On July 13, 2016, Bachman signed a contract extension to stay with Vancouver through 2018. On June 20, 2018, Bachman signed a two-year, two-way contract to remain with the Canucks organization through 2020.

While playing with Utica, Bachman suffered an Achilles injury which prematurely ended his 2018–19 AHL season on December 21, 2018.

In the following 2019–20 season, Bachman through injury found himself as the Comet's third choice upon recovery. Limited to just 3 games, while in the final season of his contract, Bachman sought and was loaned by the Canucks to Swedish club, IK Oskarshamn of the Swedish Hockey League, for the remainder of the season on February 12, 2020. He made just 3 appearances in Sweden, going winless, before the season was cancelled due to the COVID-19 pandemic.

Coaching career
On October 2, 2020, Bachman announced his retirement from professional hockey after 11 seasons and became the goaltending coach for the Iowa Wild in the AHL.

Career statistics

Regular season and playoffs

International

Awards and honors

References

External links

1987 births
Living people
American men's ice hockey goaltenders
Cedar Rapids RoughRiders players
Chicago Steel players
Colorado College Tigers men's ice hockey players
Dallas Stars draft picks
Dallas Stars players
Edmonton Oilers players
Ice hockey players from Colorado
Sportspeople from Salt Lake City
Idaho Steelheads (ECHL) players
IK Oskarshamn players
Oklahoma City Barons players
People from Highlands Ranch, Colorado
Texas Stars players
Utica Comets players
Vancouver Canucks players
AHCA Division I men's ice hockey All-Americans